Kim Chee Yun (born 1970) is a violinist from Seoul, South Korea. Her professional name is "Chee-Yun". Chee-Yun performed in Korea at the age of 13.  She studied at the Juilliard School with Dorothy DeLay, Hyo Kang, and Felix Galimir. She won the Young Concert Artists International Auditions in 1989 which led to her New York City recital debut at Carnegie Hall. She records for the Denon label.

Chee-Yun was appointed Artist-in-Residence at the Southern Methodist University, Dallas Texas in 2008.  Besides teaching, she still actively tours and gives recitals and concert performances.

Chee-Yun plays the Stradivarius "Ex-Strauss" (Cremona, 1708), loaned by Samsung Corporation.  Chee-Yun owns a Francesco Ruggieri violin made in the year 1669 which she purchased during the early years of her career. Her violin is speculated to have been buried underground for nearly two hundred years with its previous owner in Norway.

She appeared in the season 7 episode of Curb Your Enthusiasm, "Denise Handicap”.

Accolades 
 1988 winner of The Juilliard School Concerto Competitions
 1993 "Nan Pa" award (Korea)
 1990 Avery Fisher Career Grant winner

Discography 
 Vocalise - Violin Show Pieces
 French Violin Sonatas
 Mendelssohn & Vieuxtemps Concertos
 Szymanowski & Franck Violin Sonatas
 Vocalise d'amour
 Sentimental Memories
 Penderecki: Orchestral Works Volume 4
 The Very Best of Chee-Yun
 Lalo: Symphonie Espagnole and Saint-Saëns violin concerto No. 3 (1997)

References

External links 
 

1970 births
Living people
Musicians from Seoul
South Korean classical violinists
21st-century classical violinists
Women classical violinists